Alpine skiing at the 2017 Asian Winter Games was held in Sapporo, Japan between 22–25 February at Sapporo Teine. A total of four events were contested: men's and women's giant slalom and slalom.

Schedule

Medalists

Men

Women

Medal table

Participating nations
A total of 83 athletes from 19 nations competed in alpine skiing at the 2017 Asian Winter Games:

 
 
 
 
 
 
 
 
 
 
 
 
 
 
 
 
 
 
 

* Australia as guest nation, was ineligible to win any medals.

References

External links
Official Results Book – Alpine Skiing

 
2017 Asian Winter Games events
2017
2017
2017 in alpine skiing